Viktor Åkerblom, (born 31 January 1981) is a Swedish actor and television presenter. He acted in the TV-series Hotell Seger which was broadcast on Kanal 5 in 2001 . In March 2004 he started presenting the children's show Bolibompa on SVT. In 2006 he placed third in the celebrity dance show Let's Dance on TV4, he teamed up with dancer Carin da Silva.

He participated in the Findus television commercial as the chef Oliver in the same year. He has also presented the horse trot shows "Viktors vänner" and Vinnare V64 broadcast on TV4.

He has also acted with the Riksteatern in the play Svirr och snurr och sommargung, he played Aladdin in the play Aladdin och den magiska lampan at Hamburger Börs in 2010 through 2011. He played Elake Måns in Intimans play about Pelle Svanslös in 2008.

References

External links 

Living people
1981 births
Swedish male television actors
Swedish male stage actors